Andronikos II may refer to:

 Andronikos II Palaiologos (1259–1332), Byzantine Emperor
 Andronikos II of Trebizond ( 1240–1266), Emperor of Trebizond